The women's heptathlon event at the 1999 All-Africa Games was held 16–17 September at the Johannesburg Stadium.

Results

References

Decathlon